Pierre Rochefort (born 1981) is a French actor and singer. He is the son of Jean Rochefort and Nicole Garcia. At the age of five, he appeared in the 1986 short film 15 août which was directed by his mother. In 2005, he made his foray into music and founded his own record label "Homworkz". More recently, he has appeared in television, stage and film productions, including the film Going Away, for which he won the award for Male Revelation at the 2014 Cabourg Film Festival.

Filmography

Discography 
 Trente Trois Tours (2016)
 Free Your Mind (2019)

References

External links

 

1981 births
Living people
French male film actors
French male television actors
French male stage actors
20th-century French male actors
21st-century French male actors
Male actors from Paris
21st-century French singers
21st-century French male singers